Fabio Artico (born 9 December 1973 in Venaria Reale, Piedmont) is a retired Italian footballer. Artico spent most of his career at Lega Pro (ex-Serie C) but also played more than 90 matches at Serie B. He is currently in Alessandria staff.

Biography
Born in Venaria Reale, the Province of Turin, Piedmont, Artico started his career at Juventus Turin and left for Pro Vercelli in 1993, where he won Serie D champion. He played 3 more Serie C2 seasons for the Piedmontese club before left for Empoli of Serie A in 1997. After played twice at Serie A, in October he left on loan to Serie C1 side Giulianova. In the next season, he played once at 1998–99 Serie A before left for Serie B side Reggina, where he won promotion to Serie A. In 1999–2000 season he signed a 3-year contract with Ternana, also at Serie B. In 2000–01 season he left for Pescara and played 3 Serie B matches before left on loan to league rival Piacenza where he won Serie B runner-up. In 2001–02 season he returned to Pescara for Serie C1 (Group B) season. In next season, he left for SPAL of Serie C1 (Group A).

In 2003–04 season her left for Serie B side Messina but in mid-season returned to SPAL. In 2004–05 season, he left for Serie C2 side Ivrea. From 2005, he played two seasons at Serie C1 for Pro Patria. In 2007–08 season, he left for Alessandria of Serie D and followed the team promoted to Lega Pro Prima Divisione in 2009.

Honours
Serie D: 1994, 2008

References

External links
 Profile at Alessandria (2009–10) 
 Profile at AIC.Football.it 

1973 births
Living people
People from Venaria Reale
Italian footballers
Juventus F.C. players
F.C. Pro Vercelli 1892 players
Empoli F.C. players
Giulianova Calcio players
Reggina 1914 players
Ternana Calcio players
Delfino Pescara 1936 players
Piacenza Calcio 1919 players
S.P.A.L. players
A.C.R. Messina players
Aurora Pro Patria 1919 players
U.S. Alessandria Calcio 1912 players
Serie A players
Serie B players
Association football forwards
A.S.D. Calcio Ivrea players
Footballers from Piedmont
Sportspeople from the Metropolitan City of Turin